Corum is an unincorporated community in Stephens County, Oklahoma, United States. The elevation is 1,020 feet.

References

Unincorporated communities in Oklahoma